Vectomov or Večtomov is a Czech surname that may refer to
Saša Večtomov (1930–1989), Czech cellist and music pedagogue 
Sonja Vectomov (born 1979), Czech-Finnish electronic musician and composer 
Sonja Vectomov (sculptor) (born 1957), Czech sculptor
Vladimír Večtomov (1946–2015), Czech classical guitarist, brother of Saša

Czech-language surnames